The Cedar Creek Fire is a large wildfire in the U.S. state of Oregon that began on August 1, 2022, with a series of lightning strikes in the Willamette National Forest approximately  east of Oakridge.

By September 10, it was over 74,000 acres; 30,000 foot high pyrocumulonimbus clouds from the fire were producing their own lightning; Oakridge was evacuated. Smoke from the fire moved into Southwest Washington then the Puget Sound region on September 10; on that day Seattle recorded the worst air quality of any major city in the world.

By September 11 it had grown to 86,000 acres. Over 2,000 homes were evacuated.

Events

August 
Late in the day on August 1, the fire was ignited by a lightning strike. Firefighters were slow to contain the fire, due to the rough and unsafe terrain surrounding the wildfire.

On August 15, the fire grew to 4,422 acres with 0% containment. An area closure of all trailheads and dispersed camping North and West of Waldo Lake and Temporary Flight Restrictions were in effect.

On August 27, the fire grew to 7,632 acres with 0% containment. Area closures remained in effect North and West of Waldo Lake. Calm weather provided better opportunities for fire supression. Firelines were continuing to be constructed using minimum impact supressrion tactics (MIST) to reduce negative impacts on the ecosystem.

September

On September 25, the fire grew to 114,104 acres with 20% containment. 44 engines, 28 crews, 68 heavy equipment, and 9 helicopters were staffed for fire supression.

October

On October 27, the fire grew to 127,283 acres with 60% containment. Due to temperatures dropping and humidity rising, fire progression reduced drastically. 4 engines, 2 crews, 1 helicopter, and 2 masticators were staffed for fire supression. Closures had reduced on the Deschutes National Forest and Willamette National Forest. Air quality ranged from good to moderate within the forecasted area. Lane County evacuations had been lifted.

Impacts 
Smoke from the Cedar Creek Fire that blew into Seattle,  to the north, caused the city to record the worst air quality of any major city in the world. Smoke also blew into the Eugene area.

Fire progression and containment

References

External links 

2022 Oregon wildfires
2022 in Washington (state)
2022 Washington (state) wildfires
Wildfires in Washington (state)
Wildfires in Oregon